Edwin Abbott or Abbot may refer to:

Edwin Abbott (educator) (1808–1882), English educator
Edwin Abbott Abbott (1838–1926), his son, English schoolmaster and theologian, author of Flatland
Edwin Hale Abbot (1834–1927), American lawyer and railroad executive
Edwin Milton Abbott (1877–1940), American lawyer and poet who served in the Pennsylvania House of Representatives
Edwin Abbott (public servant) (1878–1947), Australian public servant
Edwin Abbott (rugby league) (1909–1976), New Zealand international

See also
Edwin Abbot House, historical house in Massachusetts